Metrius is a genus of beetles in the family Carabidae, containing the following species:

 Metrius contractus Eschscholtz, 1829
 Metrius explodens Bousquet & Goulet, 1990

References

Paussinae